KCOB-FM (95.9 FM) is a commercial radio station that serves the community of Newton, Iowa.  The station primarily broadcasts a country music format, but also provides local and national news, weather and sports.  KCOB is owned by Alpha Media, through licensee Alpha Media Licensee LLC. The station also broadcasts the St. Louis Cardinal baseball games, as well as the Newton High School football and basketball games.

Technical parameters
The transmitter and broadcast tower are located north of Newton. The tower is also used as the antenna system for its sister station, KCOB (AM).

References

External links
KCOB-FM website

COB
Alpha Media radio stations